Hajjiabad-e Atashgah (also Romanized as Ḩājjīābād-e Ātashgāh; also known as Hājī Ābād and Ḩājjīābād) is a village in Lajran Rural District, in the Central District of Garmsar County, Semnan Province, Iran. At the 2006 census, its population was 827, in 221 families.

References 

Populated places in Garmsar County